István Jakab (born 17 September 1949) is a Hungarian agronomist, politician and leader of the National Federation Of Hungarian Peasants Association And Cooperatives (MAGOSZ).

He was a founding member of the Hungarian Democratic Forum in 1988. He quit the party in 1995 and became co-chairman of the MAGOSZ and Vice President of the Hungarian Chamber of Agriculture, a position which he held until 2001. He was elected a member of the presidency of the National Cooperative Council in 1996. He has served as the sole chairman of the MAGOSZ since 1999. In this capacity, he organized the tractor farmers' protest to Budapest in early 2005, during which the capital was blocked.

His organization made an alliance with Fidesz for the 2006 parliamentary election. He gained a parliamentary seat from the Szabolcs-Szatmár-Bereg County party list. He served as deputy chairman of the Committee of Agriculture and deputy leader of the Fidesz parliamentary fraction.

After the 2010 parliamentary election he was elected to the National Assembly of Hungary again. His party nominated him for the position of one of the deputy speakers of the National Assembly of Hungary.

Personal life
He is married and has three children.

References

External links
MTI Ki Kicsoda 2009, Magyar Távirati Iroda, Budapest, 2008, 501. old. 
Jakab István országgyűlési adatlapja 
Jakab István életrajza a Fidesz honlapján 

1949 births
Living people
People from Hajdú-Bihar County
Hungarian Democratic Forum politicians
Members of the National Assembly of Hungary (2006–2010)
Members of the National Assembly of Hungary (2010–2014)
Members of the National Assembly of Hungary (2014–2018)
Members of the National Assembly of Hungary (2018–2022)
Members of the National Assembly of Hungary (2022–2026)